Roancarrigmore (Gaeilge: Róncharraig Mhór) is an uninhabited island in Bantry Bay, County Cork, Ireland and is home to Roancarrigmore Lighthouse, which was replaced in 2012 by a solar powered lighthouse after 165 years of operation.

In September 2016 the lighthouse was put up for sale.

References

Uninhabited islands of Ireland
Islands of County Cork